A silver lining is a metaphor for optimism in vernacular English, which means a negative occurrence may have a positive aspect to it.

Origin
John Milton coined the phrase 'silver lining' in his poem Comus: A Mask Presented at Ludlow Castle, 1634:

It is a metaphor comparing the silvery, shining edges of a cloud backlit by the Sun or the Moon to an unseen silver lining for the back of the cloud.

See also
 Idiom 
 Every cloud has a silver lining
Felix culpa
 Silver Lining (disambiguation)
 Is the glass half empty or half full?

References

English-language idioms
Metaphors